Hathyar (English: Weapon) is a 2002 Indian Hindi-language action crime film directed by Mahesh Manjrekar. The film is a sequel to Vaastav (1999). It stars Sanjay Dutt, Shilpa Shetty and Sharad Kapoor. Hathyar begins where Vaastav had ended and focuses on the son of Raghu bhai, Boxer bhai, also played by Dutt.

Plot 

Hathyar is a narrative which probes into the household of Raghunath, a dreaded gangster. His bereaved son Rohit (also Sanjay Dutt) has to face a lot of flak from the outside world, repeatedly reminding him of the stigma attached to his family because of his father's past. Just like his father, circumstances force Rohit to become a gangster, and he gets the nickname "Boxer Bhai". Rohit has weaknesses, and he cannot stand any woman being called a prostitute, because his mother, Sonu was one, and he has fallen hard for a married woman, Gauri, who is enduring a marriage with a physically abusive spouse. Rohit snatches her out of this abusive relationship and remarries her, and gives birth to a daughter named Shanti. But their married lives are shattered when Gauri's friend Jyoti husband, who was a police officer and informer of Fracture Nagya, gets killed by Rohit. Gauri, heartbroken, leaves Rohit and lives at her brother Munna's house. Rohit tries to contact her, but all efforts are in vain. Munna persuades Gauri to go back to Rohit, but sooner he is killed by Rohit after influenced by Pakya's false story. Gauri, angered, cuts all ties with Rohit, lives in a small house nowhere. Rohit is attacked by Pakya and his men but miraculously survives.

It is then revealed that Rohit's godfather Digamber Patil had conspired with Fracture Nagya against him and gets double-crossed by his friend Pakya. A vengeful Rohit sets out to finish Digamber, Pakya and Nagya. He locates Pakya in a guesthouse. Rohit eventually kills Nagya and is about to kill Pakya, but the latter pleads with him for forgiveness. Rohit, who considered Pakya as his friend, gets enraged by his betrayal, kills him. Subsequently, Rohit brutally murders Digamber with a cricket bat and goes in hiding.

After the turn of events, Rohit becomes the most wanted criminal and is issued "shoot at sight" orders by the Home Minister. DCP Kishore Kadam, who is Rohit's guardian, has no other option but to kill him and obey the orders. Before surrendering to the police, Rohit asks for forgiveness from Gauri and says that he was not wrong. He requests Gauri to go away, and whatever happens to him, she would not turn back. Rohit commits suicide, and the armed police force attacks Rohit.  Rohit's grandmother Shanta advises Gauri to take Shanti far away so that she would not be affected by Raghu and Rohit's dark pasts. In the end, both decide to leave the city.

Cast
Sanjay Dutt... Rohit Shivalikar aka Boxer Bhai / Raghunath “Raghu” Namdev Shivalikar (Rohit’s Father) (Double role)
Shilpa Shetty... Gauri R. Shivalkar
Deepak Tijori... DCP Kishore Kadam
Sharad Kapoor... Pakya
Shakti Kapoor... Hasan
Sachin Khedekar... Munna / Narrator
Gulshan Grover... Digamber Patil
Shivaji Satham... Namdev (Rohit's grandfather)
Reema Lagoo... Shanta (Rohit's grandma)
Namrata Shirodkar... Sonu R. Shivalkar (Rohit's mother)
Pramod Muthu... Police inspector
Inder Kumar... Amar Rane
Harsh Chhaya... Gautam Naik (Gauri's first husband)
Resham Tipnis... Jyoti Deshmukh (Gauri's friend)
Sanjay Batra... Police Inspector Shekhar Deshmukh, Jyoti's Husband 
Anup Soni... Fracture Nagya
Pankaj Berry... Fracture Nagya's brother
Sanjay Narvekar... Dedh Footiya (cameo)
Viju Khote....Chaudhary 
Ashima Bhalla... as an item number

Soundtracks

References

External links
 

2000s Hindi-language films
Indian sequel films
2002 films
Films directed by Mahesh Manjrekar
Indian gangster films
Indian action thriller films
Films scored by Anand Raj Anand
Indian thriller drama films
2002 action thriller films
2000s crime action films
2002 thriller drama films
Indian crime action films
2002 drama films